Bola Kampung: The Movie is a 2013 Malaysian 3D computer-animated science fantasy film co-directed by Ah Loong and Chong Tee Chua, based on the animated series Bola Kampung produced by Animasia Studios and Young Jump Animation. The movie was a moderate commercial success, released on March 21, 2013 in Malaysia and April 2013 in Indonesia. It is the first Malaysian animated film to be produced in 3D stereoscopic format.

Plot
Amanda, a young princess of the virtual world game Kingdom Hill, was sent to Kampung Gong Lech to find the legendary "Solar Warrior", a savior to the crisis his Kingdom.

Unfortunately, the princess had lost her memory when she arrived in Kampung Gong Lech. Iwan, the hero Bola Kampung mistake him for a supposed cousin came to visit during the school holidays. Princess Amanda then happy spending her days in the village of Iwan and his colleagues did not know that the evil villain of the virtual game world have sent assassins after him.

As time passed, Princess Amanda slowly regains her lost memories. Solar Warrior his quest for an end when she realized that she was looking for a hero chosen is drunk all together. Unfortunately, he was captured by the assassin and had to return to the Kingdom Hill.

John and his friends hatched a plan to help Princess Amanda and save his kingdom from evil villains. However, Kumar, a young scientist The village notice something has gone terribly wrong with the virtual game. He believes the cause of the threat to the Kingdom Hill is vicious virus that has invaded the game for a few days.

With no other options at hand, Iwan, drunk and Azizul enters cyberspace Kingdom Hill hoping to save Princess Amanda and destroy Lord Vilus before its too late.

Voice cast
Ezlynn as Iwan
Afdlin Shauki as Sabok
Harris Alif as Azizul
Aznil Nawawi as Lord Vilus
Marsha Milan Londoh as Amanda
Aizat Amdan as Mat
Baki Zainal as Santokh
Adilla Shakir (Dilly MixFM) as Nasha
Meester Bones as Kumar
Douglas Lim as Szeto
Harun Salim Bachik as Tok Ayah
Mamat as Mid
Meester Bones as Mud
Rahhim Omar as King
Deanna Yusoff as Queen

Production
The movie was revealed by Animasia Studios Managing Director, Edmund Chan in 13 March 2012. About 14 popular Malaysian celebrities lend their voices for their respective characters in the movie, among them are Ezlynn, Afdlin Shauki, Aznil Nawawi, Baki Zainal, Deanna Yusoff and Rahhim Omar. Vocalist of the Malaysian rock band, Hujan, Noh Salleh also involved.

Animasia Studio spent MYR6 million for the production of the film.

Release and reception
Originally slated for the end of 2012 release, the movie was officially released on March 21, 2013.

See also
 Bola Kampung

References

External links
 

2013 films
2013 3D films
Malay-language films
Malaysian animated films
2013 computer-animated films